Zemmix, trade mark and brand name of South Korean electronics company Daewoo Electronics Co., Ltd., is an MSX-based video game console brand. The brand name Zemmix is no longer in use.

Under the name Zemmix, Daewoo released a series of gaming consoles compatible with the MSX home computer standards. The consoles were in production between 1985 and 1995. The consoles were not sold outside South Korea.

Hardware

Console Models
All consoles were designed to broadcast standard NTSC, have low and high outputs for connecting to a TV and have a universal adapter for connection to the mains 120/230 volts.

The consoles also had a letter coming after the serial number.  These letters indicated the color combination of the console. The key is as follows.
 W - white and silver colors
 R - red and black colors
 B - yellow, blue and black colors

For example, CPC 51W would be a white or silver Zemmix V (see below).

Consoles compatible with the MSX standard
 CPC-50 (Zemmix)
 CPC-51 (Zemmix V)

Consoles compatible with the MSX2 standard
 CPC-61 (Zemmix Super V)

Consoles compatible with the MSX2+ standard
 CPG-120 (Zemmix Turbo)

FPGA based MSX2+ compatible console
 Zemmix Neo (by Retroteam Neo)
 Zemmix Neo Lite (by Retroteam Neo)

Raspberry PI based MSX2+ (Turbo R) compatible console
 CPC-Mini (Licensed)- Zemmix Mini (by Retroteam Neo)

Peripherals
Other Zemmix products:

By Daewoo
CPJ-905: MSX joystick for Zemmix CPC-51 console
CPJ-600: MSX joypad for Zemmix CPC-61 console
CPK-30: keyboard for Zemmix CPC-61
CPJ-102K: joystick for CPC-330
CPK-31K: input device for CPC-330

By Zemina
A Keyboard & Cartridge port divider 
The Zemina Music Box
An MSX2 Upgrade Kit
A Zemmix PC card
MSX RAM expansion cards
A 'Family Card' that allows the user to play Famicom games on the Zemmix

Software
Korean software companies that produced software for the Zemmix gaming console:
 Aproman
 Boram
 Clover
Daou Infosys
 FA Soft
 Mirinae
 Prosoft
 Screen
 Topia
 Uttum
 Zemina

Most Zemmix software works with other MSX/MSX2/MSX2+ computers too.

References

External links
More information and pictures
The entire Zemmix lineup with photos and information
Zemmix on www.videogameconsolelibrary.com

Third-generation video game consoles
MSX
Z80-based video game consoles